Madhumita Raut is an Indian classical dancer of Odissi. She is the daughter of Mamta Khuntia and Mayadhar Raut, who revived Odissi in the 1950s with Shastra-based knowledge.

She lives in Delhi, where she manages and teaches at the Jayantika Association's Mayadhar Raut School of Odissi Dance.

Early life and education
Madhumita Raut was brought up in Delhi in an atmosphere of dance and music under her father's tutelage. She received her academic qualifications at the Bharatiya Vidya Bhavan's School and Indraprastha College in Delhi.

She holds a master's degree in English literature from Delhi University and a diploma in performing arts.

Career
Madhumita Raut continues her father's legacy at Mayadhar Raut Gharana of Odissi dance.Her works include compositions on poetry, choreographic compositions on poems of Goethe, and fusion dances with Balinese dancer Dia Tantri in the Netherlands. She has used the medium of dance for social causes. She has performed for the Indian Cancer Society, Delhi, WWF(World Wildlife Fund - India), CAPF(Campaign Against Pre-Birth Elimination of Females), The Art of Living and for upliftment of the 'have-nots'.

Netherlands Channel I has made a documentary film on her. Stuttgart (Germany) and the Hungarian televisions have showcased Raut's dance in their documentary films on India. Raut has also done a lead role in a film produced by the Dutch television.
 
Madhumita Raut has danced in major dance festivals in India and in Ireland, England, Scotland, the Netherlands, Germany, Belgium, Hungary, Austria, Spain, Morocco, France, Portugal, Japan, U.S.A. etc. She also teaches Odissi in USA, the Netherlands, Japan and Germany.

She received several awards. These include Orissa State Ghungur Samman, Utkal Kanya Award, Mahila Shakti Samman, Bharat Nirman Award, Odisha Living Legend Award 2011.

Madhumita Raut wrote "Odissi: What, Why and How: Evolution, Revival and Technique", published by B.R. Rhythms, Delhi in 2007.

Awards 
Raut has received the following awards:
 Orissa State Ghungur Samman 2010
 Utkal Kanya award 2010
 Mahila Shakti Samman 2010
 Bharat Nirman Award 1997
 Odisha Living Legend Award 2011

References

 Odissi: What, Why and How : Evolution, Revival & Technique by Madhumita Raut, Published B.R.Rhythms, Delhi, 2007. .
  30th Annual awards of ‘Ghungur', 14 February 2011.
  Reviving Odissi with a focus on the classical The Hindu, 28 December 2010.
  Delectable depiction of Navararas by N K MUDGAL.
  4th Guru Shishya Parampara Dance Festival Delhi, 15 December 2008.
  Christian MySpace: What Why N How - Madhumita Raut Learn About Odissi Dance Form
  Odissi Workshop in Germany, Monday, 16 May 2011.
  Dance Recitals in Malaysia, 4 and 5 November 2011

External links

 Madhumita Raut
 Jayantika

Odissi exponents
Living people
Dancers from Delhi
Indraprastha College for Women alumni
Delhi University alumni
Bharatiya Vidya Bhavan schools alumni
Indian female classical dancers
Performers of Indian classical dance
Teachers of Indian classical dance
20th-century Indian dancers
Year of birth missing (living people)
Women artists from Delhi
20th-century Indian women